The Memorial Cimurri (also called Gran Premio Bioera) was a late season road bicycle race held annually near Reggio Emilia, in the region of Emilia Romagna, Italy. The race was organised as a 1.1 event on the UCI Europe Tour.

Winners

External links
Official site 

UCI Europe Tour races
Cycle races in Italy
Recurring sporting events established in 2005
2005 establishments in Italy
Defunct cycling races in Italy
Recurring sporting events disestablished in 2009
2009 disestablishments in Italy